Kas Hartadi (born 6 December 1970) is an Indonesian football manager and former player.

Honours

Managerial 
Sriwijaya FC
Winner
 Indonesia Super League: 2011–12

Kalteng Putra

 Third Place at Liga 2 (promoted to Liga 1) : 2018

References

1970 births
Indonesian footballers
Indonesia international footballers
Indonesian football managers
Indonesia Super League managers
Living people
KTB Bekasi players
Sriwijaya F.C. managers
Southeast Asian Games gold medalists for Indonesia
Southeast Asian Games medalists in football
Association footballers not categorized by position
Competitors at the 1991 Southeast Asian Games
People from Surakarta
Sportspeople from Central Java